The Timor and Dependencies Residency was an administrative subdivision (Residency) of the Dutch East Indies located in the Eastern half of Lesser Sunda Islands east of Lombok, it was separated in 1819 from the Governorate of Moluccas (. Its capital was at Kupang.

Administrative divisions
The Residency was divided into four divisions: Soembawa, Soemba, Flores and Timor en eilanden Soembawa division was divided to two subdistricts of Soembawa and Bima. Soemba division was divided to two subdistricts of West- and East-Soemba. Flores division was divided to five subdistricts of Manggarai, Ngada, Endeh, Maoemere, Oost-Flores en Solor-Eilanden, and Alor subdivision Timor en eilanden was divided to five subdistricts of Beloe, Noord-Midden Timor, Zuid-Midden Timor, Koepang, and Roti en Sawoe. Since Indonesian independence these subdistricts have been turned to Regencies.

List of the Residents of Timor en Onderhoorigheden

 Hendrick Hendricksz van Oldenburgh (on Solor), 1646–1648
 Hendrick ter Horst (on Solor), 1648–1654
 Jacob Verheyden (on Solor), 1654–1655
 Cornelis Ockersz (on Solor, acting), 1655
 Hendrick ter Horst (on Solor until 1657), 1655–1659
 Joseph Margits, 1659–1660
 Johan Truytman (commissioner), 1660
 Hugo Cuylenburgh, 1660–1665
 Anthony Hurt, 1665–1667
 Jacob Pietersz van den Kerper, 1667–1670
 Jacob Lidema (acting), 1670–1672
 Jacob van Wijckersloot, 1672–1680
 Joannes van den Broeck, 1681–1683
 Willem Tange (acting) 1683-1684
 Jan van Heden 1684-1684
 Willem Tange, 1684–1685
 Gerrit Hoofd, 1685–1686
 Willem Moerman, 1686–1687
 Arend Verhoeven 1687
 Willem Moerman, 1687–1698
 François van den Eynde, 1698
 Willem Moerman, 1698–1699
 Joan Focanus, 1699–1702
 Joannes van Alphen, 1702–1706
 Didloff Blad, 1706–1712
 Reynier Leers, 1712–1714
 Isaac Marmer, 1714
 Leendert Grim (acting), 1714–1715
 Willem van Putten, 1715–1717
 Barend van der Swaan, 1717–1721
 Hendrick Engelert, 1721–1725
 Balthazar de Moucheron, 1725–1728
 Steven Palm (acting), 1728–1729
 Anthony Hurt, 1729–1730
 Gerardus Bernardus Visscher, 1730–1736
 Aart Jansz Peper, 1736–1739
 Pieter Jacob Blok, 1739
 Aart Jansz Peper, 1739–1740
 Jan Dinnies, 1740-1740
 Christiaan Fredrik Brandenburg (acting), 1740–1741
 Anthony Cornelis van Oldenbarnevelt (Tulling), 1741–1742
 Christiaan Fredrik Brandenburg (acting), 1742–1744
 Jan Anthony Meulenbeek, 1744–1746
 Gilles Jacob Helmmuts (acting), 1746–1747
 Johannes Steenwegh (acting), 1747-1747/48
 Daniel van der Burgh, 1748–1754
 Elias Jacob Beynon, 1754–1758
 Johannes Andreas Paravicini (commissioner), 1756
 Hans Albrecht von Plüskow, 1758–1761
 Johan Willem Erland Daniel ter Herbruggen, 1762–1765
 Bartholomeus van Voorst, 1765–1766
 Willem Adriaan van Este (acting), 1766–1767
 Alexander Cornabé, 1767–1772
 Barend Willem Fokkens, 1772–1777
 Willem Adriaan van Este, 1777–1789
 Timotheus Wanjon, 1789–1797
 Carel Gratus Greving, 1797–1799
 J. Doser (commissioner), 1799–1800
 Hans Andries Lofsteth (commissioner), 1800–1802
 Johannes Giesler, 1802–1803
 Frans Philip Christiaan Kurtzen (acting), 1803–1804
 Pieter Bernardus van Kruijne, 1804–1807
 Frans Philip Christiaan Kurtzen (acting), 1807
 Pieter Stopkerb, 1807–1810
 Jacobus Arnoldus Hazaart, 1810–1812
 Cornelis Willem Knibbe (under British rule), 1812
 Watson (under British rule), 1812
 Joseph Burn (under British rule), 1812–1814
 Curtois (under British rule, acting), 1814
 Jacobus Arnoldus Hazaart (under British rule until 1816), 1814–18
 M. Haleweijn (acting), 1818–1819
 Jacobus Arnoldus Hazaart, 1819–1832
 Emanuel A. Francis (commissioner) 1831-32
 Johan Baptist Spanoghe, 1833–1835
 Carel Frederik Goldman, 1835–1836
 Diderik Johan van den Dungen Gronovius, 1836–1841
 Cornelis Sluyter, 1841–1844
 Siegfried George Friedrich Fraenkel, 1844–1845
 Cornelis Sluyter, 1845–1848
 Dirk Wouter Jacob Carel, Baron van Lynden, 1849–1852
 Frederik Marie Gerard van Cattenburch (acting), 1852
 Jhr. Theodoor van Capellen, 1852–1856
 Siegfried George Friedrich Fraenkel, 1856–1858
 Johannes Grudelbach, 1858–1859
 Willem Leendert Hendrik Brocx, 1859–1861
 Isaac Esser (acting), 1861–1863
 Roelof Wijnen, 1863–1864
 Jan George Coorengel, 1864–1869
 Johan Arnoud Caspersz, 1869–1872
 Jan Karel de Wit, 1872–1873
 Hendrik Carel Humme, 1873–1875
 Charles Matthieu George Arinus Marinus Ecoma Verstege, 1875–1878
 Johann Gerard Friedrich Riedel, 1878–1880
 Willem Fredrik Sikman, 1880–1881
 Salomon Roos, 1882–1884
 W. Greve, 1884–1888
 Guillaume Gérard de Villeneuve, 1888–1890
 Willem Cornelis Hoogkamer, 1890–1893
 Cornelis Marius Eduard Merens, 1893–1895
 J. L. J. A. Ruijssenaers, 1895
 J. van Wijck, 1896–1898
 Fokko Fokkens (acting), 1898–1899
 Johannes Vijzelaar, 1899–1902
 Frits Anton Heckler, 1902–1905
 J. F. A. de Rooy, 1906–1908
 E. F. J. Loriaux, 1908–1911
 C. H. van Rieschoten, 1911–1913
 Ernst Gustav Theodoor Maier, 1913–1917
 K. A. James, 1917–1918
 Anthony Hendrik Spaan, 1918–1921
 A. J. L. Couvreur, 1921–1924
 C. Schultz 1924-1927
 Paulus Franciscus Josephus Karthaus, 1927–1931
 Eugene Henri de Nijs Bik, 1931–1934
 Johan Jacob Bosch, 1934–1938
 Fokko Jan Nieboer, 1938–1942
 Cornelis Woutherus Schüller, 1945–1948
 A. Verhoef, 1948–1949

References

Residencies of the Dutch East Indies